Oakleigh railway station is a commuter railway station in the suburb of Oakleigh in the south east of Melbourne, Victoria, Australia. The station opened in 1877 as the up end of the Gippsland line, with the station being electrified in 1922. The station consists of two side which are connected to each other via the adjacent roads, additionally both platforms are connected to each other via a pedestrian subway.

Oakleigh station is currently served by the Pakenham and Cranbourne lines which are both part of the Melbourne Railway Network. Additionally the station is served by 11 bus routes including two SmartBus services. The station is appromixately 15 kilometres (9.4 mi) or around a 27 minute train ride away from Flinders Street.

Description 

Oakleigh railway station the main station in the suburb of Oakleigh. On the north side of the station is Portman Street and Haughton Road is on the south side. The station is owned by VicTrack, a state government agency, and is operated by Metro Trains Melbourne. The station is appromixately 15 kilometres (9.4 mi) or around a 27 minute train ride away from Flinders Street.

Oakleigh station consists of two side platforms which are connected by a pedestrian subway, previously platform 1 was an island platform and the station consisted of three platforms. The two platforms have direct station entrances on their adjacent roads, with platform 1 having an entrance on Haughton Road and platform 2 having an entrance on Portman Street. Both platforms are about 160 metres (.1 mi), long enough for a seven car High Capacity Metro Train. Both platforms have a heritage listed building made of red bricks which function as a ticket office and a waiting room

There are three car parks at the station. Oakleigh station is fully accessible as there the subway features lift access and both platform entrances feature ramps.

History

19th Century 
In 1877 the station opened as the western end of the Gippsland railway line, the station received its current location in 1879 when the line was extended to South Yarra railway station.

In 1883, the track was duplicated from Caulfield to Oakleigh, and in 1891, the line was duplicated to Dandenong.

In 1888 the Rosstown line opened with Oakleigh being the eastern terminus. Two years later the outer circle line opened from Oakleigh to Waverley Road station.

20th Century 

Circa 1910, the station featured two side platforms with an additional centre track. By 1915, a new station building had been constructed to the same style as Box Hill, Essendon, Spotswood and Heidelberg, and a new platform provided on the south side, plus a fifth track for engines to run around their consists. By this time, the station was controlled by two signal boxes; "A" at the city end, controlling the Warrigal Road level crossing and interlocked gates, and "B", between the station and yard, controlling the latter.

In March 1922, electrification was extended from Caulfield to Oakleigh, and this was extended to Dandenong during December of that same year. Around the same time, the Hanover Street bridge was built across the Dandenong end of the goods yard, with alterations to the passenger sidings and the run-around loop south of the station was abolished.

Three-position signalling was extended from Carnegie to the city end of Oakleigh (exclusive) in December 1940. Extension of the signalling to Huntingdale and Clayton, in lieu of Winters Double Line Block safeworking, did not occur until 1970, in conjunction with the North Road (Huntingdale) grade separation project.

In 1968, the Warrigal Road level crossing was closed and, in conjunction with the demolition of shops, a new road overpass was provided. The original Warrigal Road surface was partially retained as a slip lane to serve a handful of shops along the western boundary. The road bridge piers were spaced to allow extension of the track from the southernmost platform in the citybound direction. 

In 1975, the track layout was drastically simplified and both signal boxes were abolished and demolished, being replaced with a new, experimental route-setting power interlocking system, located in the middle of the southern station building. 

The new signal panel included a "switch out" feature, allowing the station's signalling to operate automatically during periods of reduced traffic. To facilitate this, the island platform was used for most trains, with high-speed (64 kph,40mph) turnouts provided either end to avoid trains slowing down significantly for the diverging movements. In busier periods, the signal panel was switched in by station staff, to permit access to or from the goods yard, terminating moves from the city, or overtaking moves in either direction.

In May 1984, the goods yard was officially closed to traffic, with the exception of briquette traffic, which was still being received. Way and Works wagon HD205, which had been parked at the city end of the through siding for years, was transferred to the Caulfield depot on Friday 22 June 1984. By October that year, the briquette traffic had also shifted to Westall. The overhead in siding "A" was removed by December of that year, along with the points and the majority of the sidings.

In March 1987, a guards' indicator light was provided for signal post 16, controlling citybound moves from Platform 1.

As of April 1988, suburban timetables specified an overtaking move between outbound suburban and country trains, where the 16:53 and 17:36 departures from Flinders Street to Dandenong were each scheduled to wait 3 minutes at Oakleigh, for a Traralgon and Warragul service respectively.

Since 1989, the station has featured over 40 plywood cut-outs on its walls and surrounding the station. These illustrate the life-stories of Oakleigh residents, who were aged between 15 and 70, when the murals were unveiled in September of that year. In 2002, they underwent restoration. About half of these have since been restored, and glue can still be seen on the walls of the station building where the remainder had previously been placed.

On 12 December 1995, Oakleigh was upgraded to a Premium Station.

When the Cranbourne line was electrified in 1995, trains that had previously terminated at Oakleigh were extended and the passenger sidings fell into disuse. The extended goods siding that was along the north side fell out of use and was abolished around the same time, although the shell of the citybound dwarf signal at the Down end remained in place until 2018. As a result, the signal panel was generally only used when the underpass flooded, as all trains in both directions could be diverted to the north-side platform (by then renamed Platform 3). The suburban sidings were restored to service in late 2004, but only used occasionally after that with further periods out of service.

21st Century 
In 2018 the former platform 1 was removed as it was mostly under utilized. As a result the island platform on the southern end of the station was converted into a side platform and the former platforms 2 and 3 were re-numbered to platforms 1 and 2.

Throughout 2018-2019 Oakleigh received a major upgrade in order to bring the station up to modern standards. This upgrade including building 2 new modern concourses (1 on each side) in place of the existing ones. The subway was upgraded and lifts were installed to comply with DDA guidelines. The south-eastern end of the station however including the 2 heritage listed buildings were left mostly untouched.

Platforms  and services

The station is currently served by both the Pakenham and Cranbourne lines which are both operated by Metro Trains Melbourne. Services to Pakenham and Cranbourne travel together south-east towards Dandenong before spliting into two separate lines. Services to the city run express from Caulfield (Malvern during off-peak) to South Yarra before stopping all stations to Flinders Street via the City Loop.

Platform 1:
  express services to Flinders Street
  express services to Flinders Street

Platform 2
  all stations and limited express services to Pakenham
  all stations services to Cranbourne

Future services: 
In addition to the current services the Network Development Plan Metropolitan Rail proposes linking the Pakenham and Cranbourne lines to both the Sunbury line and under-construction Melbourne Airport rail link via the Metro Tunnel.
  express services to West Footscray and Sunbury (2025 onwards)
  express services to Melbourne Airport (2029 onwards)

Transport links
Oakleigh Station is served by a total of eleven bus connections including two Smartbus routes. Most routes (624, 693, 704, 742, 800, 802, 804, 862 and Smartbus Routes 900 and 903) serve the bus interchange on Portman Street just north of the railway station. Whereas bus routes 625, 701 and 733 serve the bus stop Southern side on Johnson Street. On Haughton road there is a rail replacement bus stop used during rail works on the Pakenham and Cranbourne lines mainly along the Westall to Caulfield section.

Portman Street: 
 : to Kew
 : to Belgrave station
 : to Westall station
 : to Ringwood station to Chadstone Shopping Centre

 : Dandenong station to Chadstone Shopping Centre
 : Dandenong station to Chadstone Shopping Centre
 : Dandenong station to Chadstone Shopping Centre
 : Dandenong station to Chadstone Shopping Centre
  : Rowville to Caulfield station
  : Mordialloc to Altona station

Johnson Street: 
 : Elsternwick – Chadstone Shopping Centre
 : to Bentleigh station
 : to Box Hill station

References

External links
 
 Melway map at street-directory.com.au

Premium Melbourne railway stations
Railway stations in Melbourne
Railway stations in Australia opened in 1877
Railway stations in the City of Monash